Ugni candollei is a species of shrub, 80 cm in height, with white, 5-petal flowers, endemic to Chile. Its fruit is edible.

Distribution 
It is distributed between Maule Region and Los Lagos Region, also it can be found near the coast.

See also
Ugni molinae

References

 Linnaea 27: 388 1856.
 The Plant List entry
 Chile Flora entry
 Enciclopedia de la Flora Chilena

Myrtaceae
Flora of the Valdivian temperate rainforest